

FEI World Equestrian Games
 September 11 – 23: 2018 FEI World Equestrian Games in  Mill Spring, North Carolina (Tryon International Equestrian Center)
  won both the gold and overall medal tallies.

2018 Rolex Grand Slam of Show Jumping
 March 8 – 11: The Dutch Masters 2018 (GSSJ #1) in  's-Hertogenbosch (debut event)
 Winner:  Niels Bruynseels with horse Gancia de Muze
 July 12 – 21: CHIO Aachen 2018 (GSSJ #2) in  Aachen
 Winner:  Marcus Ehning with horse Prêt à tout
 September 5 – 9: 2018 CSIO Spruce Meadows “Masters” (GSSJ #3) in  Calgary
 Winner:  Sameh El Dahan with horse Suma's Zorro
 December 6 – 9: The CHI Geneva, Switzerland, 2018 (GSSJ #4; final) in  Geneva
 Winner:  Marcus Ehning with horse Prêt à tout

2018 Global Champions Tour
 March 22 – 25: LGCT #1 in  Mexico City Winner:  Scott Brash (with horse Ursula XII)
 April 5 – 7: LGCT #2 in  Miami Beach Winner:  Edwina Tops-Alexander (with horse California)
 April 20 – 22: LGCT #3 in  Shanghai Winner:  Grégory Wathelet (with horse Coree)
 May 4 – 6: LGCT #4 in  Madrid Winner:  Ben Maher (with horse Explosion W)
 May 10 – 12: LGCT #5 in  Hamburg Winner:  Harrie Smolders (with horse Don VHP Z)
 May 31 – June 2: LGCT #6 in  Ramatuelle-Saint-Tropez Winner:  Ben Maher (with horse Winning Good)
 June 7 – 9: LGCT #7 in  Cannes Winner:  Peder Fredricson (with horse Hansson WL)
 June 14 – 16: LGCT #8 in  Cascais-Estoril Winner:  Nicola Philippaerts (with horse H&M Harley vd Bisschop)
 June 28 – 30: LGCT #9 in  Winner:  Shane Breen (with horse Ipswich van de Wolfsakker)
 July 5 – 7: LGCT #10 in  Paris Winner:  Sameh El Dahan (with horse Suma's Zorro)
 July 13 – 15: LGCT #11 in  Chantilly Winner:  Nicola Philippaerts (with horse H&M Chilli Willi)
 July 27 – 29: LGCT #12 in  Berlin Winner:  Alberto Zorzi (with horse Fair Light van T Heike)
 August 3 – 5: LGCT #13 in  London Winner:  Scott Brash (with horse Hello Mr President)
 August 10 – 12: LGCT #14 in  Valkenswaard Winner:  Frank Schuttert (with horse Chianti's Champion)
 September 6 – 9: LGCT #15 in  Rome Winner:  Ben Maher (with horse Explosion W)
 November 8 – 10: LGCT #16 in  Doha Winner:  Ben Maher (with horse Explosion W)
 December 13 – 16: LGCT #17 (final) in  Prague Winner:  Jérôme Guery (with horse Garfield de Tiji des Templiers)

2017–18 FEI World Cup Jumping
 April 8, 2017 – December 2, 2017: 2017 FEI World Cup Jumping –  League
 Winner:  Keisuke Koike (with horses Nosco de Blondel & Van Schijndel's Diamond)
 April 20, 2017 – June 25, 2017: 2017 FEI World Cup Jumping – Central Asian League
 Winner:  Nurjon Tuyakbaev (with horse King Cornet L)
 April 29, 2017 – October 8, 2017: 2017 FEI World Cup Jumping –  League
 Winner:  LIANG Ruiji (with horse Indiana van't Heike)
 May 4, 2017 – November 26, 2017: 2017 FEI World Cup Jumping – South America League
 North SAL winner:  Santiago Medina (with horses Monterrey EJC & Concorde)
 South SAL winners (tie):  Felipe Amaral (with horse Premiere Carthoes BZ) &  Artemus de Almeida (with horse Cassilano Jmen)
 May 11, 2017 – October 29, 2017: 2017 FEI World Cup Jumping –  South African League
 Winner:  Lisa Williams (with horse Campbell)
 June 2, 2017 – October 8, 2017: 2017 FEI World Cup Jumping – Caucasus League
 Winner:  Shalva Gachechiladze (with 3 different horses)
 June 7, 2017 – March 4, 2018: 2017–18 FEI World Cup Jumping – Central European League
 North CEL winner:  Urmas Raag (with horses Ibelle van de Grote Haart & Carlos)
 South CEL winner:  Mariann Hugyecz (with horse Chacco Boy)
 March 1 – 4: 2018 FEI Central European League Final in  Warsaw
 Winner:  Jaroslaw Skrzyczynski (with horse Chacclana)
 Overall CEL winner:  Urmas Raag
 August 2, 2017 – March 18, 2018: 2017–18 FEI World Cup Jumping – North American League
 Eastern NAL winner:  Beat Mändli (with horses Dsarie & Galan S)
 Western NAL winner:  Richard Spooner (with 3 different horses)
 August 5, 2017 – December 10, 2017: 2017 FEI World Cup Jumping –  Australian League
 Winner:  Billy Raymont (with horses Anton & Oaks Redwood)
 September 21, 2017 – February 3, 2018: 2017–18 FEI World Cup Jumping –  Arab League
 Winner:  Ibrahim Bisharat (with 4 different horses)
 October 6, 2017 – December 17, 2017: 2017 FEI World Cup Jumping – South East Asian League
 Winner:  Jaruporn Limpichati (with horse Irregular Choice)
 October 12, 2017 – February 25, 2018: 2017–18 FEI World Cup Jumping –  Western European League
 Winner:  Henrik von Eckermann (with horses May Lou 194 & Newton Abbot)
 October 18, 2017 – January 14, 2018: 2017–18 FEI World Cup Jumping –  League
 Winner:  Rose Alfeld (with horse My Super Nova)

2017–18 FEI World Cup Dressage
 March 23, 2017 – March 25, 2018: 2017 FEI World Cup Dressage – Pacific League
 Winner:  Mary Hanna (with horse Calanta)
 April 19, 2017 – December 3, 2017: 2017 FEI World Cup Dressage – Central European League
 Winner:  Inessa Merkulova (with horses Avans and Mister X)
 April 27, 2017 – March 4, 2018: 2017–18 FEI World Cup Dressage – North American League
 Winner:  Laura Graves (with horse Verdades)
 October 18, 2017 – March 11, 2018: 2017–18 FEI World Cup Dressage – Western European League
 Winner:  Patrik Kittel (with horses Delaunay Old and Deja)

2018 Show Jumping World Cup and Dressage World Cup Finals
 April 10 – 15: 2018 FEI World Cup Show Jumping and Dressage Finals in  Paris
 Show Jumping winner:  Beezie Madden (with horse Breitling LS)
 Dressage winner:  Isabell Werth (with horse Weihegold OLD)

2018 FEI Nations Cup Jumping
 February 13 – 18: NCJ #1 in  Ocala
 Individual winners (tie):  Ian Millar (with horse Dixson) &  Eric Lamaze (with horse Coco Bongo)
 Team winners:  (Francois Lamontagne (with horse Chanel du Calvaire), Tiffany Foster (with horse Brighton), Ian Millar (with horse Dixson), & Eric Lamaze (with horse Coco Bongo))
 February 14 – 17: NCJ #2 in  Abu Dhabi
 Individual winners (tie):  Samantha McIntosh (with horse Check In 2) &  David Simpson (with horse Keoki)
 Team winners:  (Daniel Meech (with horse Fine), Richard Gardner (with horse Calisto), Bruce Goodin (with horse Backatorps Danny V), & Samantha McIntosh (with horse Check In 2))
 April 19 – 22: NCJ #3 in  Coapexpan
 Individual winners (tie):  Jonathon Millar (with horse Daveau) &  Alex Granato (with horse Carlchen W)
 Team winners:  (Laura Jane Tidball (with horse Concetto Son), Jenn Serek (with horse Wicked), Jonathon Millar (with horse Daveau), & Keean White (with horse For Freedom Z))
 April 26 – 29: NCJ #4 in  Šamorín
 Individual winner:  Nicola Philippaerts (with horse H&M Chilli Willi)
 Team winners:  (Werner Muff (with horse Daimler), Paul Estermann (with horse Curtis Sitte), Martin Fuchs (with horse Chaplin), & Steve Guerdat (with horse Hannah))
 May 17 – 20: NCJ #5 in  La Baule-Escoublac
 Individual winners (tie):  Maurice Tebbel (with horse Chaccos' Son),  Harrie Smolders (with horse Don VHP Z), &  Manuel Fernández Saro (with horse Cannavaro 9)
 Team winners:  (Luiz Felipe de Azevedo (with horse Chaccomo), Felipe Amaral (with horse Germanico T), Yuri Mansur (with horse Vitiki), & Pedro Veniss (with horse Quabri de L'Isle))
 May 29 – June 3: NCJ #6 in  Langley
 Individual winners (tie):  Tiffany Foster (with horse Victor) &  Richie Moloney (with horse Carrabis Z)
 Team winners:  (Richie Moloney (with horse Carrabis Z), Capt. Brian Cournane (with horse Dino), Daniel Coyle (with horse Cita), & Conor Swail (with horse Rubens LS la Silla))
 May 31 – June 3: NCJ #7 in  St. Gallen
 Individual winners (tie): Six different show jumpers won first place in this event.
 Team winners:  (Mathieu Billot (with horse Shiva d'Amaury), Alexandra Francart (with horse Volnay du Boisdeville), Nicolas Delmotte (with horse Ilex VP), & Olivier Robert (with horse Eros))
 June 14 – 17: NCJ #8 in  Sopot
 Individual winner:  Olivier Robert (with horse Eros)
 Team winners:  (Olivier Philippaerts (with horse H&M Ikker), Pieter Devos (with horse Claire Z), Jérôme Guery (with horse Garfield de Tiji des Templiers), & Niels Bruynseels (with horse Cas de Liberte))
 June 21 – 24: NCJ #9 in  Rotterdam
 Individual winners (tie): Seven different show jumpers won first place in this event.
 Team winners:  (Nicola Philippaerts (with horse H&M Chilli Willi), Niels Bruynseels (with horse Cas de Liberte), Jos Verlooy (with horse Igor), & Pieter Devos (with horse Espoir))
 July 12 – 15: NCJ #10 in  Falsterbo
 Individual winner:  Jur Vrieling (with horse VDL Glasgow V. Merelsnest N.O.P.)
 Team winners:  (Maikel van der Vleuten (with horse Idi Utopia), Michel Hendrix (with horse Baileys), Johnny Pals (with horse Chat Botte du Ruisseau Z), & Jur Vrieling (with horse VDL Glasgow V. Merelsnest N.O.P.))
 July 26 – 29: NCJ #11 in  Hickstead
 Individual winner:  Marlon Modolo Zanotelli (with horse Sirene de la Motte)
 Team winners:  (Trevor Breen (with horse Bombay), Richie Moloney (with horse Freestyle de Muze), Michael Duffy (with horse EFS Top Contender), & Anthony Condon (with horse SFS Aristio))
 August 8 – 12: NCJ #12 in  Dublin
 Individual winner:  Patricio Pasquel (with horse Babel)
 Team winners:  (Eugenio Garza Perez (with horse Victer Finn DH Z), Federico Fernández (with horse Landpeter do Feroleto), Patricio Pasquel (with horse Babel), & Enrique González (with horse Chacna))
 August 9 – 12: NCJ #13 in  Budapest
 Individual winner:  Felix Koller (with horse Captain Future 3)
 Team winners:  (Christian Rhomberg (with horse Saphyr des Lacs), Julia Houtzager-Kayser (with horse Sterrehof's Cayetano Z), Felix Koller (with horse Captain Future 3), & Max Kühner (with horse PSG Final))
 October 4 – 7: 2018 Longines FEI Jumping Nations Cup Final in  Barcelona
 Individual winners (tie): Four different show jumpers won first place in this event.
 Team winners:  (Niels Bruynseels (with horse Gancia de Muze), Pieter Devos (with horse Claire Z), Jos Verlooy (with horse Caracas), & Nicola Philippaerts (with horse H&M Harley V. Bisschop))

2018 FEI Nations Cup Dressage
 March 27 – 31: NCD #1 in  Wellington, Florida
 Individual winner:  Adrienne Lyle (with horse Salvino)
 Team winners:  (Adrienne Lyle (with horse Salvino), Sabine Schut-Kery (with horse Sanceo), Olivia Lagoy-Weltz (with horse Lonoir), Ashley Holzer (with horse Havanna 145))
 May 17 – 20: NCD #2 in  Compiègne
 Individual winner:  Cathrine Dufour (with horse Atterupgaards Cassidy)
 Team winners:  (Antonia Ramel (with horse Brother de Jeu), Rose Mathisen (with horse Zuidenwind 1187), Juliette Ramel (with horse Buriel K.H.), Patrik Kittel (with horse Well Done de la Roche CMF))
 May 23 – 27: NCD #3 in  Uggerhalne
 Individual winner:  Daniel Bachmann Andersen (with horse Blue Hors Zepter)
 Team winners:  (Therese Nilshagen (with horse Dante Weltino Old), Tinne Vilhelmson-Silfvén (with horse Paridon Magi), Jeanna Högberg (with horse Duendecillo P), Paulinda Friberg (with horse Di Lapponia T))
 June 21 – 24: NCD #4 in  Rotterdam
 Individual winner:  Edward Gal (with horse Glock's Zonik N.O.P.)
 Team winners:  (Edward Gal (with horse Glock's Zonik N.O.P.), Madeleine Witte-Vrees (with horse Cennin), Emmelie Scholtens (with horse Apache), Hans Peter Minderhoud (with horse Glock's Dream Boy))
 July 12 – 15: NCD #5 in  Falsterbo
 Individual winner:  Patrik Kittel (with horse Deja)
 Team winners:  (Patrik Kittel (with horse Deja), Juliette Ramel (with horse Wall Street JV), Jeanna Högberg (with horse Duendecillo P), Antonia Ramel (with horse Brother de Jeu))
 July 17 – 22: NCD #6 in  Aachen
 Individual winner:  Isabell Werth (with horse Emilio 107)
 Team winners:  (Isabell Werth (with horse Emilio 107), Helen Langehanenberg (with horse Damsey FRH), Dorothee Schneider (with horse Sammy Davis Jr.), Jessica von Bredow-Werndl (with horse TSF Dalera BB))
 July 26 – 29: NCD #7 (final) in  Hickstead
 Individual winner:  Pierre Volla (with horse Badinda Altena)
 Team winners:  (Anne Sophie Serre (with horse Vistoso de Massa), Alexandre Ayache (with horse Zo What), Arnaud Serre (with horse Ultrablue de Massa), Pierre Volla (with horse Badinda Altena))

2018 FEI Nations Cup Eventing
 April 20 – 22: NCE #1 in  Vairano Patenora
 Individual winner:  Alice Naber-Lozeman (with horse Acsi Peter Parker)
 Team winners:  (Luc Chateau (with horse Propriano de L'Ebat), Maxime Livio (with horse Pica d'Or), Brice Luda (with horse Valere de Bonnieres), & Raphael Cochet (with horse Sherazad de Louviere))
 May 25 – 27: NCE #2 in  Houghton Hall
 Individual winner:  Laura Collett (with horse Mr. Bass)
 Team winners:  (Hanna Knüppel (with horse Carismo 22), Peter Thomsen (with horse Sir Boggles), Ben Leuwer (with horse BGS Urlanmore Prince), & Dirk Schrade (with horse Unteam de la Cense))
 June 29 – July 1: NCE #3 in  Strzegom
 Individual winner:  Yoshiaki Oiwa (with horse Calle 44)
 Team winners:  (Christopher Six (with horse Totem de Brecey), Maxime Livio (with horse Opium de Verrieres), & François Lemiere (with horse Ogustin du Terroir))
 July 6 – 8: NCE #4 in  The Plains, Virginia
 Individual winner:  William Coleman (with horse Off The Record)
 Team winners:  (Georgie Spence (with horse Halltown Harley), Leslie Law (with horse Voltaire de Tre'), Ben Hobday (with horse Shadow Man), & Sophie Brown (with horse Wil))
 August 11 – 15: NCE #5 in  Le Pin-au-Haras
 Individual winner:  Maxime Livio (with horse Pica d'Or)
 Team winners:  (Maxime Livio (with horse Pica d'Or), Donatien Schauly (with horse Pivoine des Touches), Astier Nicolas (with horse Vinci de la Vigne), & Karim Florent Laghouag (with horse Entebbe de Hus))
 August 24 – 26: NCE #6 in  Millstreet
 Individual winner:  Thomas Carlile (with horse Upsilon)
 Team winners:  (Thomas Carlile (with horse Upsilon), François Lemiere (with horse Ogustin du Terroir), Christopher Six (with horse Totem de Brecey), & Marie Charlotte Fuss (with horse Anabolia))
 September 21 – 23: NCE #7 in  Waregem
 Individual winner:  Julia Krajewski (with horse Samourai du Thot)
 Team winners:  (Sarah Bullimore (with horse Valentino V), Flora Harris (with horse Amazing), Camilla (Millie) Dumas (with horse Artistiek), & Will Furlong (with horse Collien P2))
 October 11 – 14: NCE #8 (final) in  Boekelo
 Individual winner:  Julia Krajewski (with horse Samourai du Thot)
 Team winners:  (Julia Krajewski (with horse Samourai du Thot), Dirk Schrade (with horse Unteam de la Cense), Christoph Wahler (with horse Carjatan S), & Ben Leuwer (with horse BGS Urlanmore Prince))

Horse racing

United States

US Triple Crown

 May 5: 2018 Kentucky Derby at  Churchill Downs
 Horse:  Justify; Jockey:  Mike E. Smith; Trainer:  Bob Baffert
 May 19: 2018 Preakness Stakes at  Pimlico
 Horse:  Justify; Jockey:  Mike E. Smith; Trainer:  Bob Baffert
 June 9: 2018 Belmont Stakes at  Belmont Park
 Horse:  Justify; Jockey:  Mike E. Smith; Trainer:  Bob Baffert

Breeders' Cup

 November 2 & 3: 2018 Breeders' Cup at  Churchill Downs.

Other notable races
 January 27: 2018 Pegasus World Cup at  Gulfstream Park
 Horse:  Gun Runner; Jockey:  Florent Geroux; Trainer:  Steve Asmussen
 June 9: 2018 Metropolitan Handicap at  Belmont Park
 Horse:  Bee Jersey; Jockey:  Ricardo Santana Jr.; Trainer:  Steve Asmussen
 July 29: 2018 Haskell Invitational at  Monmouth Park
 Horse:  Good Magic; Jockey:  Jose Ortiz; Trainer:  Chad Brown
 August 11: 2018 Arlington Million at  Arlington Park
 Horse:  Robert Bruce; Jockey:  Irad Ortiz Jr.; Trainer:  Chad Brown
 August 18: 2018 Pacific Classic Stakes at  Del Mar
 Horse:  Accelerate; Jockey:  Joel Rosario; Trainer:  John W. Sadler
 August 25: 2018 Travers Stakes at  Saratoga
 Horse:  Catholic Boy; Jockey:  Javier Castellano; Trainer:  Jonathan Thomas
 September 29: 2018 Jockey Club Gold Cup at  Belmont Park
 Horse:  Discreet Lover; Jockey:  Manuel Franco; Trainer:  Uriah St.Lewis

United Kingdom

British Classic Races
 May 5: 2018 2,000 Guineas at  Newmarket
 Horse:  Saxon Warrior; Jockey:  Donnacha O'Brien; Trainer:  Aidan O'Brien
 May 6: 2018 1,000 Guineas at  Newmarket
 Horse:  Billesdon Brook; Jockey:  Sean Levey; Trainer:  Richard Hannon Jr.
 June 1: 2018 Epsom Oaks at  Epsom
 Horse:  Forever Together; Jockey:  Donnacha O'Brien; Trainer:  Aidan O'Brien
 June 2: 2018 Epsom Derby at  Epsom
 Horse:  Masar; Jockey:  William Buick; Trainer:  Charlie Appleby
 September 15: 2018 St Leger at  Doncaster
 Horse:  Kew Gardens; Jockey:  Ryan Moore; Trainer:  Aidan O'Brien

Other notable races and events
 June 19 – 23: Royal Ascot at  Ascot
 July 28: King George VI & Queen Elizabeth Stakes at  Ascot
 Horse:  Poet's Word; Jockey:  James Doyle; Trainer:  Michael Stoute
 August 22: International Stakes at  York
 Horse:  Roaring Lion; Jockey:  Oisin Murphy; Trainer:  John Gosden
 October 20: British Champions Day at  Ascot

Ireland

Irish Classic Races
 May 26: 2018 Irish 2,000 Guineas at the  Curragh
 Horse:  Romanised; Jockey:  Shane Foley; Trainer:  Ken Condon
 May 27: 2018 Irish 1,000 Guineas at the  Curragh
 Horse:  Alpha Centauri; Jockey:  Colm O'Donoghue; Trainer:  Jessica Harrington
 June 30: 2018 Irish Derby at the  Curragh
 Horse:  Latrobe; Jockey:  Donnacha O'Brien; Trainer:  Joseph O'Brien
 July 21: 2018 Irish Oaks at the  Curragh
 Horse:  Sea of Class; Jockey:  James Doyle; Trainer:  William Haggas
 September 16: 2018 Irish St. Leger at the  Curragh
 Horse:  Flag of Honour; Jockey:  Ryan Moore; Trainer:  Aidan O'Brien

Other notable races
 September 15: 2018 Irish Champion Stakes at  Leopardstown
 Horse:  Roaring Lion; Jockey:  Oisin Murphy; Trainer:  John Gosden

France

French Classic Races
 May 13: 2018 Poule d'Essai des Pouliches (French 1,000 Guineas) at  Longchamp
 Horse:  Billesdon Brook; Jockey:  Sean Levey; Trainer:  Richard Hannon Jr.
 May 13: 2018 Poule d'Essai des Poulains (French 2,000 Guineas) at  Longchamp
 Horse:  Saxon Warrior; Jockey:  Donnacha O’Brien; Trainer:  Aidan O'Brien
 June 3: 2018 Prix du Jockey Club (French Derby) at  Chantilly
 Horse:  Study of Man; Jockey:  Stéphane Pasquier; Trainer:  Pascal Bary
 June 17: 2018 Prix de Diane (French Oaks) at  Chantilly
 Horse:  Laurens; Jockey:  PJ McDonald; Trainer:  Karl Burke
 July 14: 2018 Grand Prix de Paris at  Longchamp
 Horse:  Shakeel; Jockey:  Christophe Soumillon; Trainer:  Alain de Royer-Dupré
 October 28: 2018 Prix Royal-Oak (French St Leger) at  Chantilly
 Horse:  Holdthasigreen; Jockey:  Tony Piccone; Trainer:  Bruno Audouin

Other notable races
 July 1: 2018 Grand Prix de Saint-Cloud at  Saint-Cloud
 Horse:  Waldgeist; Jockey:  Pierre-Charles Boudot; Trainer:  André Fabre
 October 7: 2018 Prix de l'Arc de Triomphe at  Longchamp
 Horse:  Enable; Jockey:  Frankie Dettori; Trainer:  John Gosden

Australia

Australian Triple Crown
 March 10: 2018 Randwick Guineas at  Randwick
 Horse:  Kementari; Jockey:  Glyn Schofield; Trainer:  James Cummings
 March 24: 2018 Rosehill Guineas at  Rosehill
 Horse:  D'Argento: Jockey:  Hugh Bowman; Trainer:  Chris Waller
 April 7: 2018 Australian Derby at  Randwick
 Horse:  Levendi; Jockey:  Mark Zahra; Trainer:  Peter Gelagotis

Other notable races
 April 14: 2018 Queen Elizabeth Stakes at  Randwick
 Horse:  Winx; Jockey:  Hugh Bowman; Trainer:  Chris Waller
 October 20: 2018 Caulfield Cup at  Caulfield
 Horse:  Best Solution; Jockey:  Pat Cosgrave; Trainer:  Saeed bin Suroor
 October 27: 2018 Cox Plate at  Moonee Valley
 Horse:  Winx; Jockey:  Hugh Bowman; Trainer:  Chris Waller
 November 6: 2018 Melbourne Cup at  Flemington
 Horse:  Cross Counter; Jockey:  Kerrin McEvoy; Trainer:  Charlie Appleby

Canada

Canadian Triple Crown
 June 30: 2018 Queen's Plate at  Woodbine
 Horse:  Wonder Gadot; Jockey:  John R. Velazquez; Trainer:  Mark Casse
 July 24: 2018 Prince of Wales Stakes at  Fort Erie
 Horse:  Wonder Gadot; Jockey:  John R. Velazquez; Trainer:  Mark Casse
 August 18: 2018 Breeders' Stakes at  Woodbine
 Horse:  Neepawa; Jockey:  Jerome Lermyte; Trainer:  Mark Casse

Other notable races
 October 13: 2018 Canadian International Stakes at  Woodbine
 Horse:  Desert Encounter; Jockey:  Andrea Atzeni; Trainer:  David Simcock

Rest of the world

Notable races
 March 31: 2018 Dubai World Cup at  Meydan
 Horse:  Thunder Snow; Jockey:  Christophe Soumillon; Trainer:  Saeed bin Suroor
 March 31: 2018 Dubai Sheema Classic at  Meydan
 Horse:  Hawkbill; Jockey:  William Buick; Trainer:  Charle Appleby
 April 29: 2018 Queen Elizabeth II Cup at  Sha Tin
 Horse:  Pakistan Star; Jockey:  William Buick; Trainer:  Anthony S. Cruz
 November 25: 2018 Japan Cup at  Tokyo
 Horse:  Almond Eye; Jockey:  Christophe Lemaire; Trainer:  Sakae Kunieda
 December 9: 2018 Hong Kong Cup at  Sha Tin
 Horse:  Glorious Forever; Jockey:  Silvestre de Sousa; Trainer:  Frankie Lor

References

External links
 International Federation for Equestrian Sports – FEI – official website
 Inside FEI Website

 
Equestrian by year